Berwyn Price (born 15 August 1951) is a former Welsh international athlete. Price was born in Tredegar, Monmouthshire, and studied at Lewis School, Pengam and the University College of Wales, Aberystwyth.

A member of the Cardiff Amateur Athletic Club, Price won the silver medal in the 110-metre hurdles at the 1974 British Commonwealth Games and the gold medal in the same event at the 1978 Commonwealth Games. Price also competed for Great Britain at the 1972 Munich and the 1976 Montreal Olympics in the 110-metre hurdles.

Price later became Assistant Director of Leisure for Swansea City Council, Head of Sports Tourism for Swansea and project manager for the "White Rock" project to replace the Morfa Stadium.

International competitions

Sources
Olympic record

References 

1951 births
Welsh male hurdlers
Sportspeople from Tredegar
Olympic athletes of Great Britain
Athletes (track and field) at the 1972 Summer Olympics
Athletes (track and field) at the 1976 Summer Olympics
Athletes (track and field) at the 1970 British Commonwealth Games
Athletes (track and field) at the 1974 British Commonwealth Games
Athletes (track and field) at the 1978 Commonwealth Games
Athletes (track and field) at the 1982 Commonwealth Games
Commonwealth Games gold medallists for Wales
Commonwealth Games silver medallists for Wales
Commonwealth Games medallists in athletics
Universiade medalists in athletics (track and field)
Living people
People educated at Lewis School, Pengam
Universiade gold medalists for Great Britain
Medalists at the 1973 Summer Universiade
Medallists at the 1974 British Commonwealth Games
Medallists at the 1978 Commonwealth Games